Cayfano Latupeirissa (born 28 April 1991) is a Dutch former professional footballer who played as a winger. He most notably played for NEC.

International career
Latupeirissahas represented the Netherlands at under-15, under-16 and under-17 level.

References

External links
 Cayfano Latupeirissa at Voetbal International  

1991 births
Living people
Dutch footballers
21st-century Dutch people
Netherlands youth international footballers
Dutch people of Moluccan descent
NEC Nijmegen players
TOP Oss players
JVC Cuijk players
VVOG players
Eredivisie players
Eerste Divisie players
Derde Divisie players
People from Lingewaard
Association football midfielders
Footballers from Gelderland